This article lists the Labour Party's election results in elections from it adopting the "Labour Party" name in 1906 until the end of the 1918 to 1922 Parliament.

Summary of general election performance

Sponsorship of candidates

Election results

By-elections, 1906–1910

January 1910 general election

Gill in Bolton, Hardie in Merthyr Tydfil, Hudson in Newcastle, Macdonald in Leicester, Parker in Halifax, Roberts in Norwich, Snowden in Blackburn, Thomas in Derby and Wilkie in Dundee were elected by taking second place in a multi-seat constituency.

By-elections, Jan–Dec 1910

December 1910 general election

Gill in Bolton, Hardie in Merthyr Tydfil, Hudson in Newcastle, Macdonald in Leicester, Parker in Halifax, Roberts in Norwich, Goldstone in Sunderland, Thomas in Derby, Wardle in Stockport and Wilkie in Dundee were elected by taking second place in a multi-seat constituency.

By-elections, 1910–1918

1918 UK general election

Wilkie won in Dundee won by taking second place in a two-seat constituency.

By-elections, 1918–1922

References

 "Polling Results: Full results for the kingdom", Manchester Guardian, 30 December 1918, pp. 9–11
 Report of the Seventeenth Annual Conference of the Labour Party (1919)

See also
Labour Representation Committee election results

Election results by party in the United Kingdom
Results 1906